Knocking or Knockin or Knockin'  may refer to:

Knocking, Austria, a hamlet, subdivision of Erlauf (municipality) in Austria
Knocking (2006 film), a documentary about Jehovah's Witnesses
Knocking (2021 film), a Swedish thriller film
"Knockin'" (song), by Spanish band Double Vision (1995)
Engine knocking, or the sound accompanying automotive combustion malfunction
Port knocking, a covert method of opening a port on a server
Roof knocking, a bombing practice of the Israeli Defense Forces
Gene knockin,  genetic engineering method
Knockin Castle, castle situated in the village of Knockin on Shropshire between Oswestry and Shrewsbury

See also
Knock (disambiguation)
Knockin' on Heaven's Door (disambiguation)